The India national rugby sevens team is a minor national sevens side.
India has also qualified for the 2010 Commonwealth Games.

Sevens was first played in India in 1886 at the Khajjiar Gymkhana.

Sri Lanka Rugby 7s
{| class="wikitable"
|-
!width=40|Year
!width=165|Cup
!width=165|Plate
!width=165|Bowl
|-
|1999||||||
|-
|2000|||||| 
|-
|2001||||||
|-
|2002||||||
|-
|2003||||||
|-
|2004||||||
|-
|2005||||||
|-
|2006||||||
|-
|2007||||||
|-
|2008||||||
|}

Rugby at the 2006 Asian Games–Group B

December 10

Rugby Sevens at the 2010 Commonwealth Games

As the host nation, India received automatic qualification into the Sevens tournament. They were placed in Group B along with giants of the game South Africa, Wales and Tonga;

Group B

October 11, 2010

Bowl Quarter Final

References

Sev
National rugby sevens teams